Mihály Kozma (born 1 November 1949) was a Hungarian football midfielder, who played for Budapest Honvéd FC and Belgium's Thor Waterschei

He won a silver medal in football at the 1972 Summer Olympics, and also participated in UEFA Euro 1972 for the Hungary national football team. He was part of Honvéd's team winning the Hungarian Championship in 1980 and 1984, respectively, and has several times been the Hungarian First Division's top scorer. His brothers György and Zoltán also played in the Hungarian First Division with Szeged, Mihály's team also prior to his move to Honvéd in early 1969.

He was prevented from making a more spectacular career due to a serious injury he suffered in the summer of 1975 during a preparatory tournament, which almost cut his career short. Having been three-times Hungarian top goal scorer in the 1970s, he spent a short period with Belgium's Thor Waterschei in the early 1980s, before returning to Honvéd in 1982. Although hardly a titular anymore, he still managed to score a number of important goals as a substitute, which proved particularly instrumental in ensuring Honvéd's 1984 championship win, following which he ended his active career.

He later also served Honvéd as team manager.

External links

1949 births
Living people
Association football midfielders
Hungarian footballers
Hungarian expatriate footballers
Hungary international footballers
Budapest Honvéd FC players
K. Waterschei S.V. Thor Genk players
UEFA Euro 1972 players
Olympic footballers of Hungary
Footballers at the 1972 Summer Olympics
Olympic silver medalists for Hungary
Hungarian football managers
Budapest Honvéd FC managers
Olympic medalists in football
Expatriate footballers in Belgium
Hungarian expatriate sportspeople in Belgium
Medalists at the 1972 Summer Olympics